is Kurumi Enomoto's first EP, released on . It debuted at #131 on the Japanese Oricon album charts, and charted in the top 300 for two weeks.

This EP is the first time Enomoto has not worked with Bump of Chicken producer Mor since her debut under For Life Music.

The title track "Anata ni Tsutaetai" was used as a promotional track for this release, receiving a music video.

Track listing

Japan sales rankings

References
 	

2009 EPs
Kurumi Enomoto albums